Frank Kimbrough (November 2, 1956 – December 30, 2020) was an American post-bop jazz pianist. He was born and raised in Roxboro, North Carolina. He did some work at Chapel Hill before moving to Washington, D. C. in 1980 and then New York City in 1981.

His influences included Herbie Nichols, Thelonious Monk, Bill Evans, Vince Guaraldi, Keith Jarrett, Cecil Taylor, Paul Bley, and Andrew Hill. After signing with Mapleshade Records, he released his first album, Star-Crossed Lovers, on cassette tape in 1986 and his first CD in 1988. In the 1990s, he was a member of the Herbie Nichols Project becoming co-leader with Ben Allison. He had also worked with Joe Locke and was with the Palmetto label. Kimbrough played in sessions with Paul Murphy. He also played in the Maria Schneider Jazz Orchestra.

Kimbrough was also a music educator, teaching piano at New York University during the 1990s, and became a professor at the Juilliard School in 2008.

Following Kimbrough's death, Newvelle Records produced a digital tribute album, Kimbrough, in 2021 that featured multiple ensembles covering 58 of his compositions.

Discography

With Ted Nash
 Rhyme & Reason (Arabesque, 1999)

With Maria Schneider

 Coming About (Enja, 1996)
 Allégresse (Enja, 2000)
 Days of Wine and Roses - Live at the Jazz Standard (ArtistShare, 2000)
 Concert in the Garden (ArtistShare, 2004)
 Sky Blue (ArtistShare, 2007)
 The Thompson Fields (ArtistShare, 2015)
 Data Lords (ArtistShare, 2020)

With Dawn Upshaw and Maria Schneider

 Winter Morning Walks (ArtistShare 2013)

With Ryan Truesdell's Gil Evans Project

 Centennial (ArtistShare 2012)
 Lines of Color (ArtistShare 2015)

Literature
 Leonard Feather and Ira Gitler, The Biographical Encyclopedia of Jazz. Oxford/New York 1999,

References

External links
 AllMusic
 
 Frank Kimbrough's home page

1956 births
2020 deaths
American jazz pianists
American male pianists
Palmetto Records artists
People from Roxboro, North Carolina
20th-century American pianists
Jazz musicians from North Carolina
21st-century American pianists
20th-century American male musicians
21st-century American male musicians
American male jazz musicians
Mapleshade Records artists
Black Saint/Soul Note artists
Sunnyside Records artists
Enja Records artists
Pirouet Records artists